Edward Latham Bevan (27 October 1861 – 2 February 1934) was a Welsh churchman, the inaugural Bishop of Swansea and Brecon from 1923 until his death, having previously been the final suffragan Bishop of Swansea.

Life

Born in Weymouth on 27 October 1861 Bevan was the son of William Latham Bevan and Louisa Dew, and nephew of George Phillips Bevan. He was educated at Hertford College, Oxford (whence he gained the degree MA (Oxon)) and ordained in 1886.

Bevan began his career with a curacy at  Holy Trinity, Weymouth after which he was Chaplain of the Gordon’ Home for Boys until 1907 when he succedeed his father as Archdeacon of Brecon. He was appointed an acting Chaplain to the 1st (Brecknockshire) Volunteer Battalion, South Wales Borderers (of which his father had been an Honorary Chaplain since 1860) and in 1907 he succeeded his father as Hon Chaplain to the battalion, retaining the role until World War I.

He was first appointed to the episcopate as the Bishop of Swansea, a suffragan bishop in the Diocese of St Davids, ordained and consecrated a bishop on 29 September 1915, by Randall Davidson, Archbishop of Canterbury, at Canterbury Cathedral; before becoming the first Bishop of Swansea and Brecon upon the erection of that diocese eight years later. At some point he gained a Doctorate of Divinity (DD).

References

1861 births
1934 deaths
Alumni of Hertford College, Oxford
Archdeacons of Brecon
Bishops of Swansea
Bishops of Swansea and Brecon
20th-century bishops of the Church in Wales